The Sword Dancer Stakes is an American race for thoroughbred horses, aged three and up, run annually in mid August at Saratoga Race Course in Saratoga Springs, New York. A prep for the Breeders' Cup Turf, it is set at a distance of one and one-half miles (12 furlongs) on the turf. A Grade I event, the race currently offers a purse of $1,000,000.

The Sword Dancer is named for the best three-year-old colt or gelding of 1959, best three-year-old, best handicap horse, and the American Horse of the Year. Sword Dancer was elected to the United States Racing Hall of Fame in Saratoga Springs, New York in 1977.

The event was inaugurated at Aqueduct Racetrack in 1975 as a six furlong sprint on dirt for three-year-old horses. Beginning in 1977, it was hosted by Belmont Park then in 1992 was moved to the Saratoga Race Course. Since inception, the Sword Dancer has been contested at various distances:
 6 furlongs : 1975–1976 (on dirt)
 8.5 furlongs ( miles) : 1977–1979
 12 furlongs ( miles) : 1980–present (on turf)

The race was run as an Invitational Handicap from 1994 to 2014.

In 2000, nine-year-old John's Call became the oldest horse to win this race.

Records
Speed record: (at current distance of  miles)
 2:23.20 – Awad (1997)

Most wins:
 2 – Majesty's Prince (1983, 1984)
 2 – El Senor (1989, 1990)
 2 – With Anticipation (2001, 2002)
 2 – Grand Couturier (2007, 2008)
 2 – Telling (2009, 2010)
 2 – Flintshire (2015, 2016)
 2 – Gufo (2021, 2022)

Most wins by an owner:
 2 – John DeWitt Marsh (1983, 1984)
 2 – Augustin Stable (2001, 2002)
 2 – Marc Keller (2007, 2008)
 2 – Alex & JoAnn Lieblong (2009, 2010)
 2 – Juddmonte Farms (2015, 2016)
 2 – Otter Bend Stables (2021, 2022)

Most wins by a jockey:
 4 – Pat Day (1987, 1997, 2001, 2002)

Most wins by a trainer:
 4 – Christophe Clement (1999, 2011, 2021, 2022)

Winners of the Sword Dancer Invitational Handicap since 1975 

 In 1987, Theatrical was awarded first place following the disqualification of Dance of Life.

References

 The 2008 Sword Dancer Invitational Handicap at the NTRA

Graded stakes races in the United States
Horse races in New York (state)
Open middle distance horse races
Grade 1 turf stakes races in the United States
Recurring sporting events established in 1975
Saratoga Race Course
1975 establishments in New York City